Thompson Farm, Thompson Farmstead, or Thompson Barn may refer to:

in the United States
(by state)
Thompson Ranch, Cottonwood, Arizona, listed on the NRHP in Yavapai County, Arizona
William H. Thompson Farmstead, East Windsor, Connecticut, listed on the NRHP in Hartford County, Connecticut
Thompson-Wohlschlegel Round Barn, Harper, Kansas, listed on the NRHP in Kansas
Thompson-Campbell Farmstead, Langdon, Missouri, listed on the NRHP in Missouri
Andrew Thompson Farmstead, Pine Bush, New York, listed on the NRHP in Orange County, New York
Alfred and Martha Jane Thompson House and Williams Barn, New Hope, NC, listed on the NRHP in North Carolina
Thompson Farm (Georgetown, Ohio), listed on the NRHP in Ohio
Thompson Farm (New London, Pennsylvania), listed on the NRHP in Pennsylvania
Thompson Farmstead (Dell Rapids, South Dakota), listed on the NRHP in South Dakota

See also
Thompson House (disambiguation)